The Nandi Award for Best Editor winners since 1981:

References

Editor
Film editing awards